Phyllostachys nigra, commonly known as black bamboo or purple bamboo, is a species of bamboo, native to Hunan Province of China, and is widely cultivated elsewhere.

Numerous forms and cultivars are available for garden use. The species  and the form P. nigra f. henonis have both gained the Royal Horticultural Society's Award of Garden Merit. The form henonis is also known as Henon bamboo and as cultivar 'Henon'.

Uses

It is used for lumber (timber), food, and musical instruments, among other things, in areas of China where it is native and also worldwide.

Phytochemistry

A 2008 study from Zhejiang University, in China, isolated several flavone C-glycosides on black bamboo leaves, including orientin, homoorientin, vitexin and isovitexin.

References

External links
 
 
 
 

nigra
Endemic flora of China
Flora of Hunan
Grasses of China
Garden plants of Asia
Medicinal plants of Asia